The Château fort de Puyravaux is a ruined feudal castle in the commune of Clairavaux in the Creuse département of France. It was built of granite but its date of construction is unknown, as is its exact location. It was probably destroyed around the middle of the 15th century.

See also
List of castles in France

External links

References

Ruined castles in Nouvelle-Aquitaine
Buildings and structures in Creuse